This is a list of main career statistics of Russian professional tennis player Karen Khachanov. All statistics are according to the ATP World Tour and ITF websites.

Performance timelines

Only main-draw results in ATP Tour, Grand Slam tournaments, Davis Cup/ATP Cup/Laver Cup and Olympic Games are included in win–loss records.

Singles
Current through the 2023 Dubai Open

Doubles
Current after the 2021 Western & Southern Open.

Significant finals

Olympic medal finals

Singles: 1 (1 Silver medal)

Masters 1000 tournaments

Singles: 1 (1 title)

Doubles: 2 (2 runner-ups)

ATP career finals

Singles: 6 (4 titles, 2 runner-up)

Doubles: 2 (2 runner-ups)

Youth Olympic medal matches

Doubles: 1 (1 silver medal)

Futures and Challenger finals

Singles: 8 (7 titles, 1 runner-up)

Doubles: 3 (1 title, 2 runner-ups)

National participation

Davis Cup (9–12)

   indicates the outcome of the Davis Cup match followed by the score, date, place of event, the zonal classification and its phase, and the court surface.

ATP Cup (5–2)

ATP Tour career earnings
Current as the end of 2021 season

Grand Slam seedings

Record against other players

Record against top-10 players

Khachanov's record against those who have been ranked in the top 10, with active players in boldface.

Wins over top 10 players
He has a  record against players who were, at the time the match was played, ranked in the top 10.

Notes

References

External links

 
 
 

Khachanov, Karen